Hayden Ernest Stoeckel (born 10 August 1984) is an Olympic and national record-holding backstroke swimmer from Australia.  He swam for Australia at the 2008 Olympics where he tied with Russia's Arkady Vyatchanin for the bronze medal in the 100m backstroke; in semifinals of the event he also set a new Australian and Commonwealth Record (52.97).  He was also part of the Australian men's 4×100-metre medley relay team that won bronze at the 2012 Summer Olympics.

Stoeckel is a member of South Australia's Norwood Swimming Club.

In 2006 Stoeckel moved to Brisbane to further his swimming career. He worked at the Dayboro Swimming Pool as a trainer and maintenance worker. He stated in an interview with channel Nine, that his time spent working there played a massive role in succeeding at the 2008 Beijing Summer Olympics.

Stoeckel started his swimming with the Berri Swimming Club in South Australia.  The swimming pool in Berri was renamed the "Hayden Stoeckel Swimming Pool" after he won two medals at the 2008 Olympics.

At the 2007 World Championships, Stoeckel failed to advance from the preliminary heats of the 50-metre backstroke after coming 21st in a time of 26.38, failing to progress by 0.14 of a second.  In the 100-metre event, he missed out on the semifinals by 0.01, placing 17th in the heats in a time of 55.64 seconds.  However, one of the swimmers ahead of him withdrew from the semifinals, so he swam, finishing last in 55.51.  He was eliminated in the heats of the 200-metre backstroke, finishing 24th in a time of 2:02.32.  He competed in the heats of the 4×100-metre medley relay, posting the fastest backstroke leg in a time of 55.18, as Australia qualified fourth.  He was dropped in favour of Matt Welsh in the final, which Australia won.

At the 2008 Australian Swimming Championships he qualified in the 100- and 200-metre backstrokes for Australia's 2008 Olympic Team, placing second and first respectively.

In the 100-metre backstroke at the 2008 Olympics, Stoeckel won his heat and was seventh fastest going into the semifinals in a time of 53.93.  He won the second semifinal in a time of 52.97, setting an Olympic, Commonwealth and Australian record to qualify fastest for the final.  In the final, he finished third in a time of 53.18, tying for the bronze medal.  American swimmer Aaron Peirsol broke the world record in 52.54 seconds to defend his Olympic title.

Stoeckel came sixth in the 200-metre back and was part of Australia's a silver-medal winning 4×100-metre medley relay.

In early 2009, he qualified to swim at the 2009 World Championships; however, two weeks before championships he withdrew from the Australian team due to an injury.

See also
 List of Commonwealth Games medallists in swimming (men)
 List of Olympic medalists in swimming (men)

References

External links
 

1984 births
Living people
Australian male backstroke swimmers
People from Renmark, South Australia
Australian people of German descent
Swimmers at the 2008 Summer Olympics
Swimmers at the 2012 Summer Olympics
Olympic swimmers of Australia
Olympic bronze medalists for Australia
Olympic silver medalists for Australia
Olympic bronze medalists in swimming
World Aquatics Championships medalists in swimming
Medalists at the 2012 Summer Olympics
Medalists at the 2008 Summer Olympics
Commonwealth Games silver medallists for Australia
Olympic silver medalists in swimming
Commonwealth Games medallists in swimming
People educated at St Peter's College, Adelaide
Swimmers at the 2010 Commonwealth Games
21st-century Australian people
Medallists at the 2010 Commonwealth Games